The thirty-third series of the British medical drama television series Casualty began airing on BBC One in the United Kingdom on 11 August 2018, one week after the end of the previous series. The series consisted of 46 episodes. Lucy Raffety continues her role as series producer, while Simon Harper continues his role as the show's executive producer. Sixteen regular cast members reprised their roles from the previous series. The series, which is billed as "The Year of the Paramedic", begins with a motorway collision stunt sequence, and features a crossover episode with spin-off series, Holby City. This series featured the departures of six cast members, including Amanda Mealing as Connie Beauchamp, Azuka Oforka as Louise Tyler and Chelsea Halfpenny as Alicia Munroe. Four new regular cast members also joined the series, while two actors began appearing in a recurring capacity.

Production 
The thirty-third series will consist of 47 episodes. Lucy Raffety continues her role as series producer while Simon Harper remains as the executive producer. Kate Oates became the show's senior executive producer from October 2018, and was promoted to Head of Continuing Drama six months later. Raffety's resignation from her position was announced on 16 April 2019. Raffety confirmed that there would be a series 33 in an interview with TVTimes, where she billed the series as the "Year of the Paramedic". In preparation for the series, two new paramedic characters were introduced to the drama.

It was announced on 24 July 2018 that the series would begin on 11 August 2018 with an episode described as "one of [the] biggest episodes in the show's history." It was previously revealed, in May 2018, that the show was filming scenes which would feature a motorway crash and a petrol tanker turning on its side. Sophie Dainty of entertainment website Digital Spy reported that there would be an explosion, which would leave one main character's life "hanging in the balance". An official statement from the show stated that the ED's paramedic crew would "face their darkest day" in the episode. Charlotte Salt, who portrays Sam Nicholls, told Elaine Reilly of What's on TV that the episodes were filmed at night over two weeks with night shoots lasting over 13 hours. On the atmosphere on-set while filming, she commented, "there's a certain buzz in the air..." The episode sees Sam die after suffering a fatal bleed from the crash, which sparks a new story for Iain as he struggles to cope with his grief. A show trailer, released on 12 August, teased "a new era" for the hospital following Sam's death. The trailer previewed Iain's guilt, the appearances of Zsa Zsa and Omo, Eddie facing trial for Alicia's rape, and upsetting scenes for Charlie and Duffy. On 16 November 2018, it was revealed via Casualty official Instagram page that the show would be receiving a new set of titles. The revamp came into effect from episode 13, which aired on 17 November 2018, replacing the show's former titles, which were introduced back in series 31.

Crossovers 
This series features crossover events with Holby City sister show Casualty. In August 2018, Raffety told Dainty (Digital Spy) that Harper enjoys the crossover events between the two dramas and wanted to produce more. She also teased some "extremely exciting crossovers" within the series. In a December 2018 interview with Dainty, Harper promised further crossovers between Holby City and Casualty, and teased an "exciting" event to be aired in spring 2019. Holby City cast member Alex Walkinshaw (Adrian "Fletch" Fletcher), who appeared in Casualty between 2012 and 2014, makes a crossover appearance in episode 31.

On 15 February 2019, it was announced that Casualty would crossover with spin-off series Holby City for two episodes, billed as "CasualtyXHolby", in March as part of the year-long twentieth anniversary celebrations for Holby City. The episodes are billed as "dramatic [and] action-packed". Both episodes were written by Michelle Lipton and directed by Steve Brett. The episodes see the hospital attacked by a cyber-virus, destroying all electric systems. A predominant story in the episodes follows Connie and Holby City character Jac Naylor (Rosie Marcel) saving the lives of colleagues after two separate major incidents, despite only having one available theatre. Harper described the episode as "pure, nail-biting, taut, emotional medical drama". He also praised the production teams of both shows for their logical creation of the episodes, and looked forward to exploring the interactions between the characters from the two shows.

Nine Casualty cast members - Mealing (Connie Beauchamp), Durr (David Hide), Stevenson (Iain Dean), Ryan (Gem Dean), Mohan (Rash Masum), Jafargholi (Marty Kirkby), Griffiths (Elle Gardner), Marshall (Noel Garcia), and Hill (Ruby Spark) - feature in the Holby City episode of the crossover, originally broadcast on 5 March 2019. The Casualty episode of the crossover, episode 26 of this series, features the Casualty cast alongside twelve Holby City cast members - Marcel (Jac Naylor), Bob Barrett (Sacha Levy), Hugh Quarshie (Ric Griffin), Guy Henry (Henrik Hanssen), Catherine Russell (Serena Campbell), Alex Walkinshaw (Adrian "Fletch" Fletcher), Kaye Wragg (Essie Di Lucca), Jaye Jacobs (Donna Jackson), Marcus Griffiths (Xavier "Xav" Duval), Nic Jackman (Cameron Dunn), Camilla Arfwedson (Zosia Self), and Belinda Owusu (Nicky McKendrick) - and two Holby City guest actors - Francesca Barrett as Beka Levy and Naomi Katiyo as Darla Johnstone.

Cast

Overview 
The thirty-third series of Casualty features a cast of characters working in the emergency department of Holby City Hospital. The majority of the cast from the previous series continue to appear in this series. Amanda Mealing appears as clinical lead and consultant in emergency medicine Connie Beauchamp, while William Beck, George Rainsford and Jaye Griffiths portray consultants Dylan Keogh, Ethan Hardy, and Elle Gardner respectively. Chelsea Halfpenny portrays specialty registrar Alicia Munroe, who later specialises in pediatric emergency medicine. Neet Mohan appears as F1 doctor Rash Masum, while Derek Thompson stars as Charlie Fairhead, the clinical nurse manager, senior charge nurse and emergency nurse practitioner. Cathy Shipton appears as Lisa "Duffy" Duffin, a sister and midwife. Charles Venn portrays senior staff nurse Jacob Masters, while Azuka Oforka features as staff nurse Louise Tyler, who is later promoted to senior staff nurse. Amanda Henderson and Jason Durr play staff nurses Robyn Miller and David Hide. Charlotte Salt, Michael Stevenson and Maddy Hill portray paramedics Sam Nicholls, Iain Dean, and Ruby Spark respectively. Tony Marshall stars as receptionist Noel Garcia. Additionally, four cast members feature on the series in a recurring capacity: Rebecca Ryan features as porter Gemma Dean; Kai Thorne portrays Blake Gardner; Joe Gaminara appears as F1 doctor Eddie McAllister; and Di Botcher plays operational duty manager and paramedic Jan Jenning.

In the opening episode of the series, Sam is killed off after succumbing to injuries sustained in a motorway collision. Salt, who had returned during the previous series, decided to leave again, but was shocked to discover her character would die. She was glad that her departure was kept hidden and felt it had a greater impact. Gaminara makes his last appearance in episode 3 after pleading guilty to attacking Alicia. Halfpenny opted to leave her role as Alicia in 2018 after deciding to pursue other roles. Alicia departs in episode 20. Oforka also chose to leave her role as Louise, having appeared in the show since series 26. The character's exit was not announced beforehand and Louise leaves in episode 24 after an ongoing financial struggle. Oforka thanked fans for their support on social network Twitter and expressed her delight at working on the drama. Griffiths' exit from the series was announced on 4 May 2019; her character left in episode 36. Mohan took a four-month break from the series in 2019 and his character departed in episode 32 after deciding to travel the globe. Rash returns during the following series. Mealing's break from the show was announced on 15 April 2019 after the actress finished filming days earlier. A show spokesperson confirmed that Connie would return in the "autumn", during the following series. Connie departs in the season finale at the conclusion of her story about posttraumatic stress disorder and drug addiction.

On 1 August 2018, Sophie Dainty of Digital Spy reported that former EastEnders actor Shaheen Jafargholi had joined the cast as new nurse, Marty Kirkby. Series producer Lucy Raffety revealed on 15 August 2018 that actress Gabriella Leon would join the show alongside Jafargholi, playing student nurse Jade Lovall. Jade first appears in episode 12, originally broadcast on 3 November 2018, while Marty first appears in episode 13, originally broadcast on 17 November 2018. Raffety also announced plans to introduce new doctors during this series. Genesis Lynea and Jack Nolan were later cast as registrars Archie Hudson and Will Noble. Archie is characterised as "bold, bolshy and extremely confident", while Will is billed as unfazed by Archie's personality. Department troubleshooter Ciaran Coulson (Rick Warden) is introduced in episode 37 as part of the semi-regular cast. He is created as an unlikeable character and rival to Connie, who tries to improve the ED after they fail to meet targets. Raffety announced on 31 May 2019 that Jacey Sallés would join the cast as porter Rosa Cadenas during the series and feature in an "interesting story" with David. Rosa first appears in episode 44.

The series features several recurring characters and multiple guest stars. It was announced on 21 June 2018 that actress Sharon Gless would reprise her guest role as neurosurgeon Zsa Zsa Harper-Jenkinson in the series. Zsa Zsa appears in episode 9. In August, it was confirmed that Ellen Thomas would be playing Jacob's mother Omo Masters from September 2018. Thomas appears in episodes 6 and 8 respectively. In February 2019, it was confirmed that Thomas had reprised the role for another stint exploring Jacob's backstory, and she appears between episode 36 and 41, where the character was killed off. Episode one features the first appearance of Max Parker as Alasdair "Base" Newman, a drug addict who Iain befriends. Parker reappears from episode five as part of the recurring cast, and departs in episode 22 when his character is killed off. Base's drug dealer, Ross West (Chris Gordon), also appears in the series across five episodes between episode 5 and episode 22. In his final episode, Ross is revealed to be Jan's son. The same storyline also sees the reappearance of DC Kate Wilkinson (Amy Noble) in episode 22, a character who has appeared on-off since series 30.

Belinda Stewart-Wilson rejoins the recurring cast as Ciara Cassidy, Dylan's alcoholic friend, in episode 2, following her appearance in the previous series. Gyuri Sarossy is later introduced as Ciara's husband, Joel Dunns, in episode 5. Both characters depart in episode 14. Accredited actor Clive Wood makes his first appearance as Duffy's "childhood sweetheart", Bill Crowthers, in episode 3. Dainty confirmed that Wood would feature prominently in Duffy's new storyline. Bill's daughter, Rachael Crowthers (Jennifer Hulman), was later introduced, appearing in episodes 7 and 16. Rash's childhood friend, Jamila Vani (Sujaya Dasgupta), appears between episode 7 and episode 11. Dylan's father, Brian Carroll (Matthew Marsh), appears in episode 9, having last featured in series 30. Gareth David-Lloyd appears as Jade's boss, Joshua Bowers, in episode 12. The character, billed as a "dishy doctor", returns from episode 15 as a love interest for Marty, but leaves in episode 20. Actor Paul Barber joined the recurring cast in episode 13 as Ernest Maxwell, a homeless man involved in a storyline with Louise. The character is killed-off in episode 23 as the storyline continues, emotionally impacting Louise. Sian Reeves reprised her role as Kim Harrison, the mother of Iain and Gem, in episode 24 and 27. Georgia Hughes joined the recurring cast as Dani Mallison in episode 27 and features in a storyline with Ruby. Harry Gilby also joined the recurring cast as Toby Williams in episode 29 and features in an ongoing story with Will. Towards the end of the series, Marty's parents, Bibi Kirkby (Badria Timimi) and Graham Kirkby (Philip Wright), were introduced as part of a story exploring Marty coming out.

Main characters 

 William Beck as Dylan Keogh
 Jason Durr as David Hide
 Jaye Griffiths as Elle Gardner
 Chelsea Halfpenny as Alicia Munroe
 Amanda Henderson as Robyn Miller
 Maddy Hill as Ruby Spark
 Shaheen Jafargholi as Marty Kirkby
 Gabriella Leon as Jade Lovall
 Genesis Lynea as Archie Hudson
 Tony Marshall as Noel Garcia
 Amanda Mealing as Connie Beauchamp
 Neet Mohan as Rash Masum
 Jack Nolan as Will Noble
 Azuka Oforka as Louise Tyler
 George Rainsford as Ethan Hardy
 Rebecca Ryan as Gemma Dean
 Charlotte Salt as Sam Nicholls
 Cathy Shipton as Lisa "Duffy" Duffin
 Michael Stevenson as Iain Dean
 Derek Thompson as Charlie Fairhead
 Charles Venn as Jacob Masters

Recurring characters 

 Paul Barber as Ernest Maxwell
 Di Botcher as Jan Jenning
 Gareth David-Lloyd as Joshua Bowers
 Joe Gaminara as Eddie McAllister
 Harry Gilby as Toby Williams
 Chris Gordon as Ross West
 Georgia Hughes as Dani Mallison
 Rebecca Ryan as Gemma Dean
 Max Parker as Alasdair "Base" Newman
 Jacey Sallés as Rosa Cadenas
 Gyuri Sarossy as Joel Dunns
 Belinda Stewart-Wilson as Ciara Cassidy
 Kai Thorne as Blake Gardner
 Rick Warden as Ciaran Coulson
 Clive Wood as Bill Crowthers

Guest characters 

 Camilla Arfwedson as Zosia Self
 Bob Barrett as Sacha Levy
 Francesca Barrett as Beka Levy
 Sujaya Dasgupta as Jamila Vani
 Sharon Gless as Zsa Zsa Harper-Jenkinson
 Marcus Griffiths as Xavier Duval
 Guy Henry as Henrik Hanssen
 Jennifer Hulman as Rachael Crowthers
 Nic Jackman as Cameron Dunn
 Jaye Jacobs as Donna Jackson
 Naomi Katiyo as Darla Johnstone
 Rosie Marcel as Jac Naylor
 Matthew Marsh as Brian Carroll
 Amy Noble as DCI Wilkinson
 Belinda Owusu as Nicky McKendrick
 Hugh Quarshie as Ric Griffin
 Sian Reeves as Kim Harrison
 Catherine Russell as Serena Campbell
 Rebecca Scroggs as Frankie Arnolds  
 Ellen Thomas as Omo Masters
 Badria Timimi as Bibi Kirkby
 Alex Walkinshaw as Adrian "Fletch" Fletcher
 Kaye Wragg as Essie Di Lucca
 Philip Wright as Graham Kirkby

Episodes

Reception 
The drama was nominated in the "Best Soap (Evening)" category at the 2018 Digital Spy Reader Awards; it came in last place with 3.8% of the total votes.

Footnotes

References

External links 
 Casualty Series 33 at BBC Online
 Casualty series 33 at the Internet Movie Database

33
2018 British television seasons
2019 British television seasons